Palpita dispersalis is a moth in the family Crambidae. It was described by Inoue in 1996. It is found in Papua New Guinea (Normanby Island).

References

Moths described in 1996
Palpita
Moths of New Guinea